The 2017 UniCredit Czech Open was a professional tennis tournament played on clay courts. It was the 24th edition of the tournament which was part of the 2017 ATP Challenger Tour. It took place in Prostějov, Czech Republic between 5–10 June 2017.

Singles main-draw entrants

Seeds

 1 Rankings are as of 29 May 2017.

Other entrants
The following players received wildcards into the singles main draw:
  Ernests Gulbis
  Martin Kližan
  Patrik Rikl
  Tommy Robredo

The following players received entry into the singles main draw as alternates:
  Marcelo Arévalo
  Lorenzo Giustino
  Jerzy Janowicz
  Nicolás Jarry
  Dmitry Popko

The following players received entry from the qualifying draw:
  Markus Eriksson
  Maxime Janvier
  Kevin Krawietz
  Petr Michnev

Champions

Singles

  Jiří Veselý def.  Federico Delbonis 5–7, 6–1, 7–5.

Doubles

  Guillermo Durán /  Andrés Molteni def.  Roman Jebavý /  Hans Podlipnik Castillo 7–6(7–5), 6–7(5–7), [10–6].

External links
 Official website

UniCredit Czech Open
Czech Open (tennis)
2017 in Czech tennis